Borup or Børup may refer to:

Places
 Borup, Minnesota, U.S.A.
 Borup, Køge Municipality, Denmark, a parish and railway town
 Borup, Randers Municipality, Denmark, a parish and small village in Randers Municipality 
 Borup Fiord, Canada
 Borup Fiord Pass, Canada
 Borup Island, Greenland
People
 Axel Borup-Jørgensen (1924-2012), Danish composer
 Morten Børup (1446–1526), Danish educator, cathedral cantor and Latin poet
 Yvette Borup Andrews (1891-1959), American photographer, filmmaker in Asia

See also
 Borups Allé, a major road in the northwestern part of inner Copenhagen, Denmark
 Borups Corners, an unincorporated community within Melgund Township, Ontario